"I Got to Give It Up" is a song recorded by German band Masterboy. It was the first single from the band's 1994 album, Different Dreams. It achieved moderate success in several European countries, reaching number 25 in Austria, number 17 in Finland and Switzerland, and number 13 in Masterboy's home-country, Germany, where it charted for 19 weeks. In France, the single failed to be a success, reaching number 41, and spending two weeks on the chart. On the Eurochart Hot 100, it peaked at number 43. In 1998, "I Got to Give It Up" was re-recorded in a remixed version with Freedom Williams and Linda Rocco as featuring, and this version is included on Masterboy's 2006 studio album US-Album.

Music video
The music video for "I Got to Give it Up" was directed by Marco Nunneli.

Track listings
 CD maxi - Germany
 "I Got to Give It Up" (single edit) — 3:35
 "I Got to Give It Up" (get away mix) — 6:01
 "I Got to Give It Up" (italo mix) — 5:24

 CD maxi - Remixes - Germany
 "I Got to Give It Up" (on and on mix) — 6:02
 "I Got to Give It Up" (guitana mix) — 5:47
 "I Got to Give It Up" (instrumental mix) — 6:02

 12" maxi - Germany
 "I Got to Give It Up" (on and on mix) — 6:02 	
 "I Got to Give It Up" (guitana mix) — 5:47

 12" maxi - Europe
 "I Got to Give It Up" (get a way mix) — 6:01 	
 "I Got to Give It Up" (italo mix) — 5:24

 CD single - France
 "I Got to Give It Up" (single edit) — 3:35
 "I Got to Give It Up" (get away mix) — 6:01

Credits
 Composition – Obrecht, Zabler, Schleh
 Lyrics – Zabler, Krauss, Schleh
 Mixing – Jeff Barnes, Rico Novarini, Thomas Engelhard
 Photograph – Fin Costello
 Production, arrangement – Jeff Barnes, Rico Novarini
 Remix – Masterboy Beat Production,  Achim Sobotta

Charts

Weekly charts

Year-end charts

References

1994 songs
1994 singles
Masterboy songs
Polydor Records singles